This is a list of members of the Victorian Legislative Assembly from 1985 to 1988, as elected at the 1985 state election:

 The Liberal member for Kew, Prue Leggoe, resigned on 8 February 1988. Liberal candidate Jan Wade was elected to replace her at the by-election held on 19 March 1988.
 The Liberal member for Ballarat North, Tom Evans, resigned on 9 May 1988. Liberal candidate Steve Elder was elected to replace him at the by-election held on 23 July 1988.

Members of the Parliament of Victoria by term
20th-century Australian politicians